The Streit Shakespeare Chair is a fold-up theater chair, manufactured by C. F. Streit Mfg. Co. at the end of the 19th century and beginning of the 20th century. The chair was upholstered in fabric or leather, and had a mahogany frame with a flip-up seat.

Chairs
Individual models of furniture